The discography of American rapper Quando Rondo consists of one studio album, six mixtapes, and forty-five singles.

Studio albums

Mixtapes

Collaborative mixtapes

Singles

As lead artist

Other charted and certified songs

Guest appearances

Notes

References

Hip hop discographies
Discographies of American artists